The Frăsinet is a right tributary of the river Teslui in Romania. It flows into the Teslui in Dobrosloveni.

References

Rivers of Romania
Rivers of Dolj County
Rivers of Olt County